Richard Milboune or Melbourne (died 1451), of Laverstock, Wiltshire, was an English politician.

He was a Member (MP) of the Parliament of England for Wiltshire in May 1421, 1423, 1425 and 1439.

References

Year of birth missing
1451 deaths
English MPs May 1421
People from Wiltshire
English MPs 1423
English MPs 1425
English MPs 1439